Erik Bertelsen (8 August 1912 – 18 March 1993) was a Danish ichthyologist, who specialised in deep sea fish. The fish, Diaphus bertelseni  is named in his honour.

He studied biology at the University of Copenhagen (1930 -) and in 1937 started work on the Dana collection at Charlottenlund Castle and also for the Danish Fisheries Investigation (DFI). He earned a doctorate in 1951 with his dissertation, The ceratioid fishes. Ontology, taxonomy, distribution and biology. He was director of DFI from 1958 to 1971, when he resigned to work at the zoological museum of the University of Copenhagen, where with fewer administrative duties he was able to concentrate on his research on deep sea fish. In 1961 he was made a Knight of the Order of the Dannebrog.

Taxon described by him
He authored over 50 taxa. 
See :Category:Taxa named by Erik Bertelsen and a wikidata query

His zoological author abbreviation is Bertelsen.

Research
In 1932 he participated in a fisheries biology research trip to the Faroe Islands and Iceland. In 1933 (as part of the 7th Thule expedition) he carried out benthic studies in the Angmagssalik area, followed by work in 1935 in the south-east Greenland fjords and Icelandic fjords.

Selected publications

References

1912 births
1993 deaths
Danish ichthyologists
20th-century Danish zoologists
Knights of the Order of the Dannebrog
University of Copenhagen alumni